The Warring states crystal glass ( / ) is an artifact found in a Warring States period mausoleum tomb, which dates just before 221 BCE Qin dynasty, China.  The glass however, looks no different from a modern drinking glass.

Dimensions
The glass measures 15.4 cm tall.  It has a round opening and is transparent.  The glass is made from a natural high-quality crystal.  It looks no different from a modern drinking glass.  The artifact is one of sixty-four that can never leave Chinese soil.

Discovery
In 1990, the glass was unearthed in Hangzhou, Zhejiang province. Specifically, it was found in Banshan town, Shitang village in a Warring states period mausoleum.  The item was found underground about one metre deep.  Du Zhengxian insisted on the archaeological digging even when other archaeologists had already labeled that area of the village a worthless wasteland.  After two months of digging, he found the glass, along with other treasures.  It became the biggest finding of the Warring states tombs.

See also
 Ancient Chinese glass

References

Zhou dynasty
Archaeological artifacts of China
History of glass
1990 archaeological discoveries